Stoney Creek is a  long 2nd order tributary to the Ararat River in Surry County, North Carolina.

Variant names
According to the Geographic Names Information System, it has also been known historically as:
Isaacs Creek
Stony Creek

Course
Stoney Creek rises on the Toms Creek divide about 2 miles southeast of Sheltontown, North Carolina.  Stoney Creek then flows southwest to join the Ararat River about 3 miles north of Ararat, North Carolina.

Watershed
Stoney Creek drains  of area, receives about 47.9 in/year of precipitation, has a wetness index of 354.23, and is about 45% forested.

See also
List of rivers of North Carolina

References

Rivers of North Carolina
Rivers of Surry County, North Carolina